This is a list of the members of the Dewan Rakyat (House of Representatives) of the 6th Parliament of Malaysia, elected in 1982.

Composition

Elected members by state


Unless noted otherwise, the MPs served the entire term of the parliament (from 14 June 1982 until 19 July 1986).

Perlis

Kedah

Kelantan

Trengganu

Penang

Perak

Pahang

Selangor

Federal Territory of Kuala Lumpur

Negri Sembilan

Malacca

Johore

Sabah

Sarawak

Notes

References

Abdullah, Z. G., Adnan, H. N., & Lee, K. H. (1997). Malaysia, tokoh dulu dan kini = Malaysian personalities, past and present. Kuala Lumpur, Malaysia: Penerbit Universiti Malaya.
Anzagain Sdn. Bhd. (2004). Almanak keputusan pilihan raya umum: Parlimen & Dewan Undangan Negeri, 1959-1999. Shah Alam, Selangor: Anzagain. 
Chin, U.-H. (1996). Chinese politics in Sarawak: A study of the Sarawak United People's Party. Kuala Lumpur: Oxford University Press.
Crouch, H. (1982). Malaysia's 1982 General Election. Institute of Southeast Asian Studies.
Dewan Bahasa dan Pustaka. (1982). Dewan masyarakat, Volume 20. Selangor Darul Ehsan, etc: Media Network Sdn. Bhd., etc..
Faisal, S. H. (2012). Domination and Contestation: Muslim Bumiputera Politics in Sarawak. Institute of Southeast Asian Studies.
Hussain, M. (1987). Membangun demokrasi: Pilihanraya di Malaysia. Kuala Lumpur: Karya Bistari.
Ibnu, H. (1993). PAS kuasai Malaysia?: 1950-2000 sejarah kebangkitan dan masa depan. Kuala Lumpur: GG Edar.

Malaysian parliaments
Lists of members of the Dewan Rakyat